The constituency of Larissa (Greek: Εκλογική περιφέρεια Λάρισας) is a legislative district of Greece. It corresponds to the territory named Larissa. It has 250,630 registered voters in January 2015.

References

See also 

Parliamentary constituencies of Greece
Larissa